Kavar County is in Fars province, Iran. The capital of the county is the city of Kavar. At the 2006 census, the region's population (as Kavar District of Shiraz County) was 72,423 in 15,570 households. The following census in 2011 counted 77,836 people in 19,681 households, by which time the district had been separated from the county to form Kavar County. At the 2016 census, the county's population was 83,883 in 23,013 households.

Administrative divisions

The population history and structural changes of Kavar County's administrative divisions over three consecutive censuses are shown in the following table. The latest census shows two districts, four rural districts, and one city.

References

 

Counties of Fars Province